Young Independents, abbreviated to SUS, is the youth wing of the Independence Party of Iceland.

Young Independents was founded at Þingvellir on 27 June 1930: the year after the Independence Party itself.  Its current chairman is Lísbet Sigurðardóttir, who was elected on 12 September 2021.

It is liberally conservative, like its mother party, but often expresses more classical liberal views.  The party can conduct its own policy and campaigns. In 2011, it criticised capital controls, subsidies to the Symphony Orchestra, and the application for EU membership.  In February 2011, it ran an advert in Morgunblaðið that urged Independence Party MPs to vote against the government paying foreign liabilities accrued by Icesave.  SUS put forward an alternative budget in 2010, and criticised Independence Party MPs for following convention by not voting against the government's budget.

Its largest branch is its Reykjavík branch, Heimdallur.

Footnotes

External links
  Young Independents official website

1930 establishments in Iceland
Youth wings of Alliance of Conservatives and Reformists in Europe member parties
Youth wings of conservative parties
Youth wings of political parties in Iceland
Independence Party (Iceland)